Rutherford may refer to:

Places

Australia 
 Rutherford, New South Wales, a suburb of Maitland
 Rutherford (Parish), New South Wales, a civil parish of Yungnulgra County

Canada 
 Mount Rutherford, Jasper National Park
 Rutherford, Edmonton, neighbourhood
 Rutherford House, in Edmonton, Alberta
 Rutherford Library, University of Alberta

United Kingdom 
 Rutherford Appleton Laboratory, Oxfordshire

United States 
 Rutherford, California, in Napa County
 East Rutherford, New Jersey
 Rutherford, New Jersey
 Rutherford, Pennsylvania
 Rutherford, Virginia
 Rutherford, West Virginia
 Rutherford County, North Carolina
 Rutherford County, Tennessee

People 
 Rutherford (name), people with the surname or given name
 Ernest Rutherford (1871–1937), 1st Baron Rutherford of Nelson, known as the father of nuclear physics
 Rutherford B. Hayes (1822–1893), 19th president of the United States (1877–1881)

Fiction 
 Rutherford the Brave, a character from Gamehendge, the fictional setting for a number of songs by the rock band Phish
 Rutherford, Ohio, fictional setting of the television series 3rd Rock from the Sun
 Cullen Stanton Rutherford, a character from the Dragon Age franchise

 Ensign Sam Rutherford, a major character in Star Trek: Lower Decks

Transportation 
 Rutherford GO Station, a station in the GO Transit network located in the community of Maple, Ontario, Canada
 Rutherford Intermodal Yard, a large rail yard located in Swatara Township, Dauphin County, just east of Harrisburg, Pennsylvania
 Rutherford (NJT station), a train station on New Jersey Transit's Bergen County Line
 , a British frigate in commission in the Royal Navy from 1943 to 1945

Science 
 Rutherford (unit), a unit of radioactivity
 Rutherford scattering, a phenomenon in physics which led to the development of the Rutherford model (or planetary model) of the atom and eventually to the Bohr model
 Rutherford (lunar crater), a small impact crater on the Moons far side
 Rutherford (Martian crater), a crater on Mars

Economics 
 R & I.S. Rutherford Brothers of St John's, issued the first traders' Halfpenny tokens for Newfoundland in 1841

Education 
 Rutherford College (disambiguation), more than one college
 Rutherford High School (disambiguation), several schools
 Rutherford School (disambiguation), several schools

Other uses 
 Rutherford Institute, a public interest law firm and resource center in Charlottesville, Virginia
 The Rutherford Journal, an academic journal
 Rutherford (rocket engine), a rocket engine developed by Rocket Lab

See also 
 John Rutherfoord
 Rutherfurd (disambiguation)